Huusgavel, Huusgafvel, or Husgafvel, is listed as number 2102 on the List of Swedish noble families. The family originates from Veckelax Vehkalahti, Finland.

References

Sources

External links
 
The Weckelax Families

Swedish noble families
Finnish families
Swedish families of Finnish ancestry